The South Zone cricket team is a first-class cricket team that represents southern India in the Syed Mushtaq Ali Trophy and previously in Duleep Trophy and Deodhar Trophy also. It is a composite team of players from six first-class Indian teams from southern India competing in the Ranji Trophy: Andhra Pradesh, Goa, Hyderabad, Karnataka, Kerala, Tamil Nadu and Telangana. South Zone has the third strongest track record of all the zones in the Duleep Trophy, as they have won the Trophy 11 times, with the best team, North Zone having won 17 times.

Current squad

International players from South Zone

Roger Binny 
S. Venkataraghavan
Syed Abid Ali
Mansur Ali Khan Pataudi
Syed Kirmani
Brijesh Patel
M. L. Jaisimha
Abbas Ali Baig
Mohammad Azharuddin
Lakshmipathy Balaji
Rahul Dravid
Dinesh Karthik
Anil Kumble
V. V. S. Laxman
Sreesanth
Javagal Srinath
Venkatesh Prasad
Pragyan Ojha
Bhagwat Chandrasekhar
Erapalli Prasanna
Kris Srikkanth
Gundappa Viswanath
Sunil Joshi
Murali Vijay
Vijay Bhardwaj
Ravichandran Ashwin
Robin Uthappa 
Karun Nair
Manish Pandey
Stuart Binny
Vinay Kumar
Abhinav Mukund
Abhimanyu Mithun
Sreenath Aravind
Vijay Shankar (cricketer)
KL Rahul
Mayank Agarwal
Hanuma Vihari
Mohammad Siraj
Sanju Samson
Washington Sundar
T. Natarajan

Tinu Yohannan

External links
 South Zone at CricketArchive

Indian first-class cricket teams